Lutynia  is a village in the administrative district of Gmina Miękinia, within Środa Śląska County, Lower Silesian Voivodeship, in south-western Poland.

The village currently has a population of 1,100.

History
It is the site of the Battle of Leuthen, where Frederick the Great of Prussia inflicted a heavy defeat on the Austrians on December 5, 1757.

Prior to 1945 it was in Germany; it previously belonged to Prussia and earlier to the Austrian Empire.

Notes

References

External links
School website

Lutynia
Battlefields in Poland